Winnetou (full German title: Winnetou – Der Mythos lebt) is a German television miniseries directed by Philipp Stölzl and starring Nik Xhelilaj and Wotan Wilke Möhring. It is based on three adventure novels by Karl May. It has been broadcast in three parts on RTL in late December 2016.

Cast
 Nik Xhelilaj as Winnetou
 Wotan Wilke Möhring as Old Shatterhand
 Mario Adorf as Santer Sr.
 Michael Maertens as Santer Jr.
 Jürgen Vogel as Rattler
 Iazua Larios as Nscho Tschi
 Katarina Strahinic as Ochina
 Milan Peschel as Sam Hawkens
 Jani Zombori Banovac Apachie kringer
 Valim Kleber as Häuptling der Hoppa

References

External links
 Official website 

2016 television films
2016 films
2010s German television miniseries
2016 German television series debuts
2016 German television series endings
2016 Western (genre) films
German Western (genre) films
2010s German-language films
German-language television shows
Films directed by Philipp Stölzl
Television series set in the 19th century
Television shows set in New Mexico
Television shows based on German novels
Winnetou films
Remakes of German films
Live action television shows based on films
RTL (German TV channel) original programming
Television shows based on works by Karl May
2010s German films